Police Dog Hogan are a British band whose music combines elements of country, folk and bluegrass.  The band have been active since 2008 and released five albums and three EPs.

History
The band was formed by vocalist James Studholme and fiddle player Eddie Bishop, who were joined by mandolin player Tim Jepson and guitarist Pete Robinson for the band's first gig.  By the time of the band's first recording session in 2009, drummer Michael Giri, formerly of The Lilac Time, and banjo player Tim Dowling had been added to the line-up.  The seventh member to join was bass guitarist Adam Bennette. Robinson and Bennette left the band after the recording of the Westward Ho! album.  Bennette was replaced by Don Bowen (bass), and trumpeter Emily Norris also joined the band. In 2014 Shahen Galichian (piano, keyboards, accordion), formerly of the Golden Manor Medicine Show, joined the line-up.

The band have appeared at festivals such as Larmer Tree, Bestival, Kendal Calling and Glastonbury and released five albums, the second of which, From the Land of Miracles, was produced by Eliot James.  The third and fourth albums, Westward Ho! and Wild By The Side Of The Road were produced by Al Scott whose production credits include Oysterband and the Levellers.  The band's most recent EP, Hard Times Comin''', released in 2019 was also produced by Scott.  When the band returned from a hiatus in 2020, drummer Giri had been replaced by Alistair Hamer, formerly of Sweet Billy Pilgrim.  In December 2020 the band released a Christmas single, "First Christmas Alone", accompanied by a video, with all proceeds going to the homeless charity Crisis.

In January 2022, they released their fifth studio album, Overground.

Discography
Albums

Extended playsFuzzy Folk Riot (2009)Moutarde! (2015)Hard Times Comin''' (2019)

Singles
"First Christmas Alone" (2020 - UK Singles Downloads Chart #85)

Members

James Studholme – lead vocals, guitar
Eddie Bishop – violin, vocals
Tim Dowling – banjo, guitar, harmonica, vocals
Don Bowen – bass guitar, vocals
Alistair Hamer – drums, vocals
Shahen Galichian - accordion, piano, keyboards, harmonica, harmonium, vocals
Emily Norris - trumpet, vocals

References

External links
Official website

English bluegrass music groups
Musical groups established in 2008
2008 establishments in England